Ryan LLC, based in Dallas, Texas, is a tax services and software provider. Ryan LLC has more than 18,000 clients in over 60 countries. The company has over 113 locations around the globe, including locations in Canada, the Netherlands, the United Kingdom, India, the Philippines, and Australia. Ryan LLC works with companies including 7-Eleven, the Kroger Company, Walmart Stores, and Johnson & Johnson.

History
Ryan LLC was founded by Chairman and CEO G. Brint Ryan and Chris F. Collis as the CPA firm Collis & Ryan in 1991. Collis' stake in the company was bought out in 1993, and Ryan became the majority shareholder and managing principal of the company, which was renamed Ryan & Company, P.C. In 1997, the company began expanding into other tax areas beyond state and local taxes. During this time, the company also began to shift its focus to working with clients with annual revenues of $50 million or more. In 1998, the company surrendered its CPA license and began practicing as a tax and consultation firm.

Throughout the early 2000s, the company began expanding its operations outside of Texas by opening new offices through acquisitions. By December 2006, the company had expanded to 28 locations throughout North America. In October 2007, the company changed its name to Ryan LLC.

In 2012, Ryan LLC acquired the TAARP Group, a tax and penalty review firm. Since 2012, Ryan LLC has been included on the Inc 5000 list of fastest growing companies. Ryan LLC acquired the property tax services business from Thomas Reuters in January 2013. In November 2014, Ryan LLC announced its purchase of WTP Advisors, an independent tax services firm.

Ryan purchased Taxaccord, a tax automation services firm, in January 2015. In March 2015, Ryan LLC acquired Second Decimal, a tax technology firm. Ryan LLC acquired EnerTax Consultants to expand its severance tax practice in September 2015. In 2016, the company acquired Shiv Om Consultants, a firm known for consulting major gas and oil companies on severance taxes. Ryan LLC reported a revenue of $469 million in 2016.

In March 2017, Ryan LLC purchased land at the Legacy West development in Plano, Texas. In January 2018, Ryan LLC acquired PetroTax Energy Holdings, an Austin-based tax consulting firm focusing on the refining, chemical, biofuels, and oil and gas mid and upstream sectors, and Scott B. Retzloff & Associates, a San Antonio-based commercial real estate firm. In 2019, the company announced plans to move around 550 employees to the Legacy West development by 2023.

In September 2018, Ryan LLC became a founding member of the Massachusetts Institute of Technology's FINTECH @ CSAIL initiative created to advance technologies in the financial sector.

In October 2018, Onex Corporation acquired a 42 percent interest in Ryan LLC, which valued the company at $1.1 billion.

In December 2018, Ryan LLC acquired Denver-based Economics Partners, a global transfer pricing advisory, controversy and business valuation service. The same month, Ryan LLC acquired Paris-based VAT Systems, a tax specialty firm.

In June 2019, Ryan, LLC became the "Official Tax Partner" of the Dallas Cowboys, which marks the first time in team history a business tax services firm has been granted this designation. Later that year, Ryan, LLC became the "Official Tax Partner" of Conference USA (C-USA) and became the title sponsor for the C-USA Football Championship Game and the 2020 C-USA Basketball Championships.

In July 2019, Ryan, LLC acquired AEC Property Tax, Inc., Canada's largest privately owned property tax consulting firm and its subsidiaries, AEC Valuation Advisory, Inc. and AEC SYMMAF Inc.

In December 2019, Ryan, LLC announced the acquisition of state and federal payroll tax recovery firm SALT Payroll Consultants, a subsidiary of Pinpoint Recovery Solutions Corporation.

In November 2020, Ryan, LLC announced the acquisition of Indirect Tax Solutions (ITS), an indirect tax services firm based in Sydney, Australia. Ryan, LLC also acquired the Real Estate Tax Group (RETG), a market leader in property tax consulting. Ryan also announced an investment in and exclusive partnership with Incentify, a provider in tax credits and incentives (C&I) software.

In December 2020, Ryan, LLC acquired TCF Services (TCF), a provider in R&D tax credits firm in Australia. Ryan, LLC also announced the acquisition of Burgess Cawley Sullivan (BCS), a property tax consulting and appraisal firm in Vancouver, British Columbia.

In March 2021, Ryan, LLC announced the acquisition of PTX Tech (PTX), a property tax data and software firm based in Atlanta, Georgia. Then in August of that year, Ryan, LLC acquired the assets of PS Johnson, a property tax consulting firm in Ontario, followed by the October 2021 acquisition of Mentor Works, a government funding and grants firm in Ontario. Ryan, LLC also that month announced the release of owner claims portal module of Tracker PRO, a software solution designed to streamline management of the entire unclaimed property due diligence process. In December 2021, Ryan, LLC acquired Qvalia’s value added tax (VAT) compliance and recovery business in the Nordics.

In January 2022, Ryan, LLC announced the acquisition of Tax Advisory Services Group, LLC (TASG), a full-service excise tax provider based in Houston, Texas. Then in February 2022, Ryan LLC acquired MacRostie Historic Advisors, LLC (MHA), a property tax consulting firm in the United States. In March 2022, Ryan LLC announced the acquisition of Catax, a research and development (R&D) and capital allowances tax reclaim specialist operating in the United Kingdom (UK), and Canada, followed in May 2022 with the acquisition of Greystone Property Tax Advisors (“Greystone”), a property tax consulting firm located outside of Boston, Massachusetts. In July, 2022, Ryan, LLC announced the acquisition of Paradigm DKD Group, L.L.C., doing business as Paradigm Tax Group (PTG), an independent national provider of comprehensive property tax management services.

Corporate affairs
The company formed a Workforce Effectiveness Committee to investigate an employee flexibility policy in 2006. In 2007, the company launched myRyan, a results-focused work environment, as a pilot program in its Houston office. The company implemented the program through the entire company in 2008. In 2013, Ryan LLC established the Culture Council, a team of employees from around the globe that review all internal and external employee feedback data in order to recommend change and improvement for the betterment of the business.

Employees of Ryan LLC can contribute to political campaigns through Ryan PAC, a political action group formed by the firm in 2008.

Litigation
In August 2014, the Governor's Office of Business and Economic Development prohibited site-selection consultants from taking a percentage of the California Competes Tax Credit, a tax break given to businesses planning on locating or expanding in the state. Ryan sued GO-Biz shortly after the agency implemented the tax credit ban, alleging the prohibition violates the state of California constitution.

In 2014, Ryan LLC won a lawsuit against the IRS regarding Circular 230 rules on contingent fee arrangements that invalidates and permanently enjoins the IRS from prohibiting such arrangements for refund claims and amended returns. The district court ruled that the IRS did not have the statutory authority to place these restrictions.

In 2017, Ryan LLC joined CIC Services, LLC in filing a lawsuit against the IRS to secure an injunction stopping IRS Notice 2016-66. The notice required transactions of captive insurance companies to report more information on transactions. The case was dismissed in November 2017.

Recognition
The company was included on The Dallas Morning News' Top 100 Places to work list for six straight years, from 2009-2014. Ryan LLC was featured on the Working Mother list of 100 best companies in 2013, 2014 and 2016.

In 2015, Ryan LLC made the Fortune list of 100 Best Companies to Work For and was ranked number 60 on the list in 2022. In 2016, Fortune named Ryan LLC the best workplace for flexibility in the U.S. and ranked them among the Top 50 Best Workplaces for Recent College Graduates, the 100 Best Workplaces for Millennials, and the 100 Best Workplaces for Women. In 2017, Ryan was named one of Fortunes 30 Best Workplaces for Consulting and Professional Services and one of the 100 Best Workplaces for Diversity.

In 2018, Ryan LLC was again named among Fortune'''s 100 Best Companies to Work For, and Best Workplaces for Women, as well as Great Place to Work's Best Workplaces for Millennials and Parents, and the Best Workplaces for Consulting and Professional Services.

Ryan LLC was named 21st of Glassdoor's Employee's Choice 2019 Best Places to Work.

Also in 2019, Fortune named Ryan one of its Best Workplaces for Women and among its top 100 Best Companies to Work For in the United States. Ryan LLC was also named as one of Great Places to Works Best Workplaces for Parents in 2019.

In 2020, Ryan was included on the 2020 Fortune 100 Best Companies to Work For list for a third consecutive year. Fortune also selected Ryan, LLC as a Best Workplace in Texas for the fourth consecutive year. Additionally in 2022, Ryan, LLC is named one of the 100 Best Adoption-Friendly Workplaces by the Dave Thomas Foundation and is also named One of the Best Workplaces for Parents by Great Place to Work.

In 2021, Ryan, LLC received International recognitions from Great Place to Work such as the 2021 Best Workplaces in Canada, 2021 Best Workplaces for Women in Canada, and ranked first in the UK Best Workplaces list. Also in 2021, Ryan, LLC is named to the 2021 People Companies That Care list  and is named to the 2021 Best Workplaces for Women list by Fortune'' for the fourth time.

In 2022, Ryan, LLC is named to India’s 2022 Best Companies to Work for list by Great Place to Work and is Named as a 2022 Best Workplace for Women™ in the UK.

Philanthropy 
Ryan LLC volunteers work with Habitat for Humanity and have built a neighborhood resource center as well as a family residence. The company received the 2012 Spirit of Habitat award for advocating and raising awareness of the program. In 2013, Ryan offices sponsored outreach initiatives for 77 community organizations, including the American Red Cross, The Salvation Army Angel Tree, Ronald McDonald House Charities, and food and clothing banks and shelters. As of 2022, the company offered employees 16 hours of paid volunteer time, and spent over $500,000 in philanthropic donations.

COO Ginny Kissling serves on the Board of Directors for the North Texas Food Bank.

References

External links
Official website

Consulting firms of the United States
Consulting firms established in 2001